Andrew McManus was the owner and promoter of the short lived World Wrestling All-Stars promotion. The WWA toured Australia, Europe and New Zealand airing their shows on USA pay-per-view.  McManus appeared on air a few times  to make some announcements, but mainly ran things from behind the scenes. Andrew has since founded McManus Entertainment, a music promotion company.

McManus' company, McManus Entertainment had been the promoter of Raggamuffin since its launch in 2008.

In 2014, McManus Entertainment partnered with Dawn Raid Entertainment to move Raggamuffin from Rotorua to Auckland.

Andrew McManus has been a prominent concert promoter in the Australian live music landscape and has been promoting tours across, rock, pop, reggae, opera, classical and indie genres for over twenty years.  Notable and high profile tours of Australia by international acts, promoted by his company include Fleetwood Mac, Motley Crue and Aerosmith.

In August 2022 One World Entertainment in partnership with TEG Live presented the Australian End Of The Road Tour by rock band KISS to sold out shows throughout the country.  Founding KISS member and bass player, Gene Simmons said of promoter Andrew McManus, 'He's family, and the best promoter in the world.  We wouldn't be here without him.'

References

Further reading

External links
 

Music promoters
Australian company founders
Professional wrestling promoters